Pseudotachidiidae is a family of crustaceans belonging to the order Harpacticoida.

Genera

Genera:
 Afrosenia Huys & Gee, 1996
 Anapophysia Huys & Gee, 1996
 Apodonsiella Hicks, 1988

References

Harpacticoida